Wood Road Metal Truss Bridge is a historic Baltimore (petit) truss bridge located at Campbell in Steuben County, New York. It was constructed in 1897 by the Phoenix Iron Works of Phoenixville, Pennsylvania and spans the Cohocton River.  The bridge was rehabilitated in 2003.

It was listed on the National Register of Historic Places in 2005.

References

Buildings and structures in Steuben County, New York
Truss bridges in the United States
Road bridges on the National Register of Historic Places in New York (state)
Bridges completed in 1897
Transportation in Steuben County, New York
National Register of Historic Places in Steuben County, New York
Metal bridges in the United States